The 2015 Levene Gouldin & Thompson Tennis Challenger was a professional tennis tournament played on hard court. It was the 22nd edition of the tournament which was part of the 2015 ATP Challenger Tour. It takes place in Binghamton, United States between 20 and 26 July 2015.

Singles main-draw entrants

Seeds

 1 Rankings are as of July 13, 2015.

Other entrants
The following players received wildcards into the singles main draw:
  Kyle Edmund
  Reilly Opelka
  Tommy Paul
  Noah Rubin

The following players received entry into the singles main draw with a protected ranking:
  Ryan Sweeting
  Greg Jones

The following players received entry from the qualifying draw:
  Sekou Bangoura
  Ernesto Escobedo
  Marcos Giron
  Nicolas Meister

Champions

Men's singles 

  Kyle Edmund def.  Bjorn Fratangelo, 6–2, 6–3.

Men's doubles 

  Dean O'Brien /  Ruan Roelofse def.  Daniel Nguyen /  Dennis Novikov, 6–1, 7–6(7–0)

External links
Official Website

 
Levene Gouldin and Thompson Tennis Challenger
Levene Gouldin & Thompson Tennis Challenger
Levene
Levene Gouldin and Thompson Tennis Challenger
Levene Gouldin and Thompson Tennis Challenger